The Continuing Criminal Enterprise Statute (commonly referred to as CCE Statute or Kingpin Statute) is a United States federal law that targets large-scale drug traffickers who are responsible for long-term and elaborate drug conspiracies. Unlike the RICO Act, which covers a wide range of organized crime enterprises, the CCE statute covers only major narcotics organizations. CCE is codified as Chapter 13 of Title 21 of the United States Code, . The statute makes it a federal crime to commit or conspire to commit a continuing series of felony violations of the Comprehensive Drug Abuse Prevention and Control Act of 1970 when such acts are taken in concert with five or more other persons. For conviction under the statute, the offender must have been an organizer, manager, or supervisor of the continuing operation and have obtained substantial income or resources from the drug violations.

The sentence for a first CCE conviction is a mandatory minimum of twenty years' imprisonment (with a maximum of life imprisonment), a fine of not more than $2 million, and the forfeiture of profits and any interest in the enterprise. Under the so-called "super kingpin" provision added as subsection (b) to the CCE statute in 1984, a person convicted of being a "principal" administrator, organizer, or leader of a criminal enterprise that either involves a large amount of narcotics (at least 300 times the quantity that would trigger a five-year mandatory-minimum sentence for possession) or generates a large amount of money (at least $10 million in gross receipts during a single year) must serve a mandatory life sentence. Anyone engaging in a continuing criminal enterprise who intentionally kills a person or causes an intentional killing may be sentenced to death. Probation, parole, and suspension of the sentence are prohibited.

Famous cases

Black Mafia Family
The Black Mafia Family was a major cocaine distribution organization led by brothers Demetrius "Big Meech" Flenory and Terry "Southwest T" Flenory. Originally from the streets of Southwest Detroit, the brothers started selling $50 bags of crack in high school and by the early 1990s were distributing thousands of kilograms of cocaine in over 21 states.

Rayful Edmond III
Rayful Edmond was convicted of distributing thousands of kilograms of cocaine in the Washington, D.C. area. His trial featured the first ever anonymous jury in the District's history. Furthermore, jurors were kept behind bulletproof glass in the courtroom and the defendant, Edmond, was housed at the U.S. Marine Base at Quantico and flown in daily on military transport.

Larry Hoover
Larry Hoover was the founder of the Gangster Disciples street gang and was alleged to be its leader despite being in prison since 1973. On August 31, 1995, Hoover was arrested by federal agents at the Vienna Correctional Center and moved to MCC Chicago, being charged with Continuing Criminal Enterprise and a host of other charges related to gang activity. He is currently serving a life sentence at the super-maximum security facility in ADX Florence in Florence, Colorado.

Tijuana Cartel
Several leaders of the Tijuana Cartel all would eventually have CCE charges brought against them for cocaine, heroin, methamphetamine, and marijuana trafficking offenses; as well as numerous murders. All brothers involved in the cartel are now either dead, or in prison.

Augusto Falcon and Salvador Magluta
Salvador "Sal" Magluta and Augusto "Willy" Falcon operated one of the most significant cocaine trafficking organizations in South Florida history. They were indicted by a federal grand jury in April 1991 for a plethora of drug trafficking crimes, including operating a continuing criminal enterprise. They were accused of importing and distributing over 75 tons of cocaine, or over 68,181 kilograms (150,000 lbs). Both Magluta and Falcon were found not guilty after a lengthy trial before Judge Federico Moreno.  Magluta was represented by Roy Black, Martin Wienberg, and Richard Martinez and Falcon was represented by Albert Krieger, Susan Van Dusen, and D. Robert "Bobby" Wells. Following the trial, the United States Attorney's Office directed an investigation into Magluta and Falcon's finances that ultimately revealed that members of their jury - including the jury foreman - had been bribed.  Magluta, Falcon, several of the jurors, their associates and even some of their lawyers were ultimately charged with various criminal offenses arising from the conduct.  Magluta was eventually sentenced to 205 years in federal prison, while Falcon received only 20 years after striking a plea deal with the government. Magluta was initially transferred to the supermax federal prison facility in Florence, Colorado.  In 2010, after Magluta's attorney, Paul Petruzzi, sued the Federal Government, Magluta was transferred out of ADX Florence. Federal agents involved in the case say there are few drug traffickers in history more successful or well-known than Magluta and Falcon. Magluta is currently seeking a new trial based on over 40 legal violations.  He is presently represented by Paul Petruzzi and Richard Klugh.

Felix Mitchell
Felix "The Cat" Mitchell was a well-known heroin kingpin and leader of the "69 Mob" in Oakland, CA. At its height, his empire covered all of California and extended into the Midwest. His organization brought in an estimated $400,000 in monthly business. In 1985 Felix was convicted of running a continuing criminal enterprise and sentenced to life in prison in USP Leavenworth, one of the most violent facilities in the country. Less than a year into his sentence, on August 21, 1986, Felix was stabbed to death in his cell, just days before his 32nd birthday. His funeral was a major spectacle in Oakland. Over 10 Rolls-Royce limousines trailed the horse-drawn carriage that carried his body. Many celebrities and over 1,000 people attended the elaborate funeral, which received international media coverage.

Ross William Ulbricht
Ross William Ulbricht was indicted under the Continuing Criminal Enterprise statute, along with other offenses, for running the Silk Road online marketplace.  On February 4, 2015, he was found guilty on all counts. On May 29, 2015, Ulbricht was sentenced to two life sentences plus 40 years without the possibility of parole.

Joaquin Guzman
Joaquin "El Chapo" Guzman was the leader of the Sinaloa Cartel, a drug cartel known for shipping cocaine, methamphetamines, marijuana, and heroin throughout the US. He was charged with 27 separate violations and the jury decided that he was guilty of 25. Guzmán was imprisoned at ADX Florence, a supermax prison in Colorado, after he was sentenced on July 17, 2019.

See also

RICO Act
United States Patriot Act

References

External links
 CCE Act from Cornell University's U. S. Code Database
 FBI definitions of CCE and RICO laws

Law enforcement in the United States
United States federal controlled substances legislation
United States–Central American relations
United States–South American relations
United States–Asian relations
History of drug control
Drug policy of the United States
United States federal criminal legislation